Red Faction: Armageddon is a third-person shooter video game developed by Volition and published by THQ in association with the TV network Syfy. It is the fourth and final installment in the Red Faction series, and was released for Microsoft Windows, PlayStation 3 and Xbox 360 in various countries around the world between June 7 and June 10, 2011.

Critics liked the new weaponry, but were puzzled at the change from an open world game to a linear shooter and that it threw out the strong points of its predecessor. Poor sales resulted in THQ's decision to stop releasing games in the Red Faction franchise and negatively impacted their financial quarter. The rights to the series were owned by THQ Nordic, yet they would later be transferred to its sister company Koch Media, which would place it under its Deep Silver label in 2020.

Gameplay
Like its predecessor Red Faction: Guerrilla, Red Faction: Armageddon is a third-person shooter. The player takes on the role of Darius Mason, a descendant of Guerrillas Alec Mason. The game is set 50 years after the conclusion of Guerrilla. Most of the game is set in a tunnel complex inhabited by alien creatures.

As in previous games in the franchise, landscape destruction is possible through the "Geo-Mod" feature. In this game, the player can use a device called a Nano Forge to repair structures such as stairs, allowing them to progress through the caves. Audio logs can be found throughout the complex. When played they provide elements of backstory. Various vehicles can be used including a mine cart and a barge. The player can also use mech suits at some points in the game.

Synopsis

Setting

The game takes place on the planet Mars. It is set in the year 2175, fifty years after the events of Red Faction: Guerrilla. Since the liberation of Mars, the surface of the planet has become uninhabitable. This occurred when the massive Terraformer machine on Mars which supplied it with its Earth-like atmosphere was destroyed by Adam Hale, the game's key antagonist, causing super-tornados and violent lightning storms to engulf the planet. In order to survive, the Colonists were forced to flee to the underground mines of Mars built by their ancestors, creating a network of habitable caves under the surface of the planet and setting up colonies there.

The game begins five years after the relocation to the mines in 2175, and follows Darius Mason, grandson of Martian Revolution heroes Alec Mason and Samanya, the main characters of Red Faction: Guerrilla, who runs a lucrative series of businesses based in Bastion, the underground hub of Colonist activity, including mining, scavenging and mercenary work. Few sane people venture to the ravaged surface of Mars, apart from contractors like Darius and smugglers who transport goods between settlements. Darius is tricked into reopening a mysterious, vast shaft in an old Marauder temple by a fanatical Marauder priest, which awakens a long-dormant race of Martian creatures, causing an Armageddon on Mars. Colonist and Marauder settlements alike are torn apart by the new enemies, and the blame for the whole disaster is placed on Darius, soon inciting several angry colonists to form mobs and attack him in their fury. Now Darius must join the Red Faction to clear his name and save the people of Mars, as his grandfather did before him.

Plot
A group of Cultists, a splinter faction of the Marauders led by Adam Hale, attacked and captured a terraformer that controls the weather of Mars. Red Faction forces, led by Frank Winters along with Darius Mason, made an assault on the terraformer. Unfortunately, Adam, disguised as one of the Red Faction, tricks Darius and destroys the terraformer. The destruction of the terraformer results in catastrophic weather which forces the entire population underground.

A few years later, Darius is working as a freelance miner along with a Marauder friend named Kara within the town of Bastion. Darius begins to leave Bastion for a job when Kara tells him not to go due to a major storm coming and her having a bad feeling about the job. Mason shrugs it off as nothing to worry about. She then tosses him a Benjamin Franklin medallion which she explains is " to ward off lightning strikes" for good luck. When Darius is sent to do the mining job, he becomes trapped in the tunnels. At the same time, he learns that he was tricked again by Adam Hale and the cultists who disguised themselves as archaeologist hiring Mason to open a seal that releases an alien race called the Plague. Which, coincidentally happens to dwell in the same tunnels. After falling off a cliff that left him unconscious for three days, Darius, guided by SAM (Situation Awareness Module), escapes the tunnels into an underground mining colony where he finds the Plague attacking the citizens. Grouping up with survivors and some Red Faction soldiers, he escorts an ambulance convoy to Bastion with the help of a L.E.O exosuit that is found along the way. Darius then arrives at Bastion to discover that the town is overrun by the Plague, with all the injured holed up in the center of town. Darius helps out, only to have them turn on him when they find out that he was involved in the release of the Plague. As he escapes to the surface, the pursuers following him are attacked and slaughtered by the alien race. The Red Faction, along with Frank, shows up and arrests him, but are attacked, at which point Darius joins the Red Faction and helps fend off the Plague.

Informed that Hale is involved with releasing the Plague, Frank lets Darius know where the Cultists are hiding. Darius assaults them in a walker with Kara, and discovers Hale trying to tame the Plague. Darius then attempts to kill Hale, but fails. Because of this, he tries to escape in a minecart. Hale pursues Darius with his walker. Eventually the walker is crippled by a landslide. Darius takes out his Magnet Gun to finish Hale by dropping pieces of the ceiling on him, and results with Hale being decapitated. He is then picked up by Kara and escape in a walker to a Marauder city where they hope to learn more about the Plague. They discover a secret entrance that is filled with lava, but it's inaccessible, so Darius and Frank take a barge to the machine used to raise the lava, and destroy it to lower the lava. Darius and Kara then head through the tunnels to find the alien Queen, but Kara is killed when they get out to repair a leg. With Kara gone, he takes a personal vendetta against the Queen. He finds her, and in the fight, badly weakens her. Enraged, she begins her ascent to the surface in order to take it over.

At this point, SAM discovers that the Plague cannot withstand an Earth-like atmosphere. Hearing this, Darius with the help from the nano forge needs to repair the terraformer to bring back the atmosphere. S.A.M explains due to their underground depth they would have to break surface fast to stop Plague from over running Mars. Mason decides the quickest way to the surface is to latch on one of the Queens tentacles during her ascension. He finds the terraformer that Hale destroyed, traverses its Plague infestation within and repairs it, killing off the Plague. The Red Faction along with Marauder forces soon arrives at the terraformer to secure the area. After a brief conversation with Frank, Mason looks at the terraformer to see the clouds start to dissipate after years of dust storms. A thunderstorm starts to appear off at a distance and sunlight breaking through the clouds. Darius pulls out the Franklin medallion he received from Kara and stares at it. SAM warns Darius of high concentration of radiation coming into the atmosphere to which Mason replies "Easy there genius. That's the sun."

Development and release

The game was announced in the form of a short teaser trailer on June 4, 2010 on GameTrailers TV. The game was also showcased at the E3 2010 from June 15 to 17, 2010. During Comic-Con in San Diego, 2010, a promotional comic book titled Red Faction: Armageddon #0 was presented as a free giveaway. A downloadable vehicle-based multiplayer game called Red Faction: Battlegrounds was released in April 2011.

Additionally, the Syfy network produced a direct-to-television film that bridges the story gap between Guerrilla and Armageddon, titled Red Faction: Origins. It was released in June 2011. A playable demo for the game was announced in April, and was released on May 3, 2011 for the Xbox 360. The playable demo for PlayStation 3 was released on June 2, 2011. A playable demo of the Windows version was released exclusively through the OnLive service.

To promote Red Faction: Armageddon, THQ released Red Faction: Battlegrounds, a multi-directional shooter in April 2011. The game was developed by THQ Digital Warrington and released on Xbox Live Arcade and PlayStation Network. Red Faction: Battlegrounds is a top-down twin-stick vehicle-based shooter with gameplay similar to a demolition derby.

Downloadable content
The expansion DLC called Red Faction: Armageddon - Path to War was released worldwide on August 2, 2011.

Soundtrack

While previous installments had various composers, Armageddon was composed by Brian Reitzell.

Reception

Critical reception

Overall, each platform of the game received a mostly positive rating aggregate from Metacritic. The PlayStation 3 and Xbox 360 versions each received a 71/100 score with the Windows version earning a slightly higher rating of 75/100.

According to GameSpot, "Red Faction: Armageddon returns to the linear roots of the series with great success. Thanks to an enjoyably powerful arsenal and remarkably thorough destructibility, tearing your way through this alien-annihilating adventure is very gratifying... and the arrival of the magnet gun should be celebrated by anyone with a hankering for havoc. It's one of the most powerful, inspiring, and downright hilarious gameplay mechanics to come along in a while, and it makes Red Faction: Armageddon immensely appealing." GameSpy said that "The main campaign has gone from an open-ended, Grand Theft Auto-style game to a strictly linear, close-quarters, and poorly plotted mess" and also describes the 'ruin mode' as "...incredibly fun in short bursts, but without any overarching goals or real sense of rewards, it's really more of a time-waster than an honest-to-goodness game in its own right." However, it did praise the new weapons available, saying, "you get some pretty nifty gear with which to do said dealing."

IGN wrote, "Despite its forgettable story and pacing issues with the campaign, Red Faction: Armageddon is good fun for letting out your inner destructive child." GameZone's Mike Splechta gave the Xbox 360 version 8.5 out of 10 and said, "I wasn't sure whether I would like the game's change from Guerrillas open world formula to a more linear mission-based one. However, this wasn't the case. The storyline is gripping, if at times a bit cliché; the controls are spot on; and leveling all that's around you never gets old. Red Faction: Armageddon is simply a blast to play through." GamePro gave it and the PS3 version three-and-a-half stars out of five and said, "Armageddons not bad, it's just plain. The game feels like Volition started from scratch, but accidentally threw out too much of what made the last game great." Joystiq said of the Xbox 360 version: "In Red Faction: Armageddon, developer Volition has run from everything that made Red Faction: Guerrilla great, and is left with a drab, heartless lump of competence for its efforts." MTV's Russ Frushtick concluded "Volition has transformed Red Faction back into a mindless, forgettable shooter. Here's hoping they right the ship for the next release." In Japan, where the PS3 and Xbox 360 versions were ported and published by Spike on June 9, 2011, Famitsu gave both console versions each a score of two nines and two eights for a total of 34 out of 40.

Digital Spy gave it three stars out of five and said that the series has taken "one small step forward, but not quite the giant leap that was needed." The Escapist also gave it three stars out of five and called it "a polished and satisfying reflex shooter that removes meaningful decisions from the game and trivializes its own greatest technology." Edge gave it a score of six out of ten and said, "Once again, Volition delivers exceptional tech, but fails to shape it into a truly engaging and sustaining experience." However, The A.V. Club gave it a C and said, "Everything Armageddon does, it does well, in the same way that a lobotomy victim might walk and talk just fine." Metro gave the PS3 version a score of four out of ten and called it a "Backwards sequel that sabotages or removes all the best features from the last game and wastes one of the best arsenals in gaming."

Ben "Yahtzee" Croshaw of Zero Punctuation ranked the game fourth on his list of the Five Worst Games of 2011, saying, "With a plot that felt like it had dropped half its cue cards and peeled the other half off a homeless man's back scabs, and the trademark destructo-physics reduced to a carnival sideshow, Red Faction: Armageddon slips comfortably into the heavily stained underpants of fourth place."

Path to War

The PS3 and Xbox 360 versions of the Path to War DLC received "mixed" reviews according to Metacritic.

Sales
The sales of Red Faction: Armageddon were poor and the game was considered a commercial failure by THQ. Because of this, on June 27, 2011, THQ announced that plans for future installments had been cancelled. The disappointing sales of Armageddon, along with other factors, had led THQ to lose $38.4 million in a fiscal year. While no actual sales figures are revealed, after THQ declared bankruptcy in December 2012, developer Volition, which was purchased by Deep Silver in an auction, revealed that the development of both Red Faction: Guerrilla and Red Faction: Armageddon had "lost quite a bit" of money for THQ.

References

External links
 
 
 
 

2011 video games
Games for Windows certified games
Multiplayer and single-player video games
PlayStation 3 games
Red Faction
Science fiction video games
Third-person shooters
THQ games
Video game sequels
Video games adapted into comics
Video games set in the 22nd century
Video games set on Mars
Video games using Havok
Windows games
Xbox 360 games
Video games developed in the United States